Serdar Gözübüyük (born 29 October 1985) is a Dutch professional football referee of Turkish descent in the Netherlands. He has officiated in 2014 FIFA World Cup qualifiers, beginning with the match between Malta and Italy on 26 March 2013.

References

1985 births
Living people
Sportspeople from Haarlem
Dutch people of Turkish descent
Dutch football referees
UEFA Europa League referees